The General Anaya station is a station on the Monterrey Metro. The station was opened on 30 November 1994 as the northern terminus of the inaugural section of Line 2, between General Anaya and Zaragoza. On 31 October 2007, the line was extended north to Universidad. General Anaya is an underground station located on Avenida Alfonso Reyes in the city of Monterrey.

The General Anaya station is located nearby the FEMSA headquarters building and just a few steps from the Cervecería Cuauhtémoc Moctezuma.

See also
 List of Monterrey metro stations

References

Metrorrey stations
Railway stations opened in 1994
1994 establishments in Mexico
Railway stations located underground in Mexico